Fabrizio Fabbri (28 September 1948 – 3 June 2019) was an Italian cyclist.

Major results

1970
3rd Gran Premio Industria e Commercio di Prato
1971
2nd Giro dell'Appennino
1972
1st Stage 5 Giro d'Italia
1973
1st Gran Premio Industria e Commercio di Prato
1st Stage 2 Tour de Suisse
2nd Giro dell'Umbria
2nd Coppa Placci
3rd Giro di Toscana
1974
1st Gran Premio Industria e Commercio di Prato
1st Overall Giro di Puglia
2nd Coppa Bernocchi
1975
1st Stage 16 Giro d'Italia
1st Giro dell'Appennino
1st Tre Valli Varesine
2nd Giro dell'Umbria
1976
1st Stage 9 Giro d'Italia

References

1948 births
2019 deaths
Italian male cyclists
Sportspeople from the Province of Pistoia
Cyclists from Tuscany
Tour de Suisse stage winners